Severe Tropical Cyclone Namu was considered to be one of the worst tropical cyclones to impact the Solomon Islands on record, after it caused over 100 deaths within the island nations. It was first noted as a weak tropical depression to the north of the Solomon Islands during May 15, 1986. Over the next couple of days, the system  Located north of the Solomon Islands, the storm steadily intensified while meandering. After briefly moving west, the storm attained Category 2 intensity on the Australian intensity scale on May 18, as it moved through the island chain on the next day. After retaining its peak intensity for a day, Namu turned south and weakened steadily. By May 21, the winds of Cyclone Namu had been reduced to only . Continuing to weaken, Namu turned east and dissipated on May 22, away from the island chain.

The system impacted the Solomon Islands, Vanuatu and New Caledonia and caused over 100 deaths, as well as varying amounts of damage to the island nations. As a result, the name Namu was later retired from the lists of tropical cyclone names for the South Pacific by the World Meteorological Organization.

The storm's slow motion allowed for prolonged periods of heavy rainfall, resulting in phenomenal flooding across the Solomon Islands. The islands of Malaita and Guadalcanal experienced the most significant damage from Namu. Coastal areas of the former were severely damaged by rough seas and strong winds, especially along the eastern side where entire villages were destroyed. Meanwhile, on the island of Guadalcanal, a village of 43 people had only 5 survivors. Moreover, Cyclone Namu flooded 75% of the Guadalcanal's plains. In addition, 22% of homes were either damaged or destroyed on the island.

Across the Solomon Island group, schools, buildings, electricity, water supplies, roads, communication systems, forests, and agriculture sustained widespread damage. In some regions, nearly all homes were destroyed. Mudslides destroyed roads, bridges, water pipes and drainage systems. Crops such as cocoa, copra, coffee, and rice were destroyed. Villages throughout the entire island group sustained severe damage. Overall, approximately 90,000 people, one third of the country's population, were reported as homeless. In all, Cyclone Namu was responsible for at least 150 deaths, mostly from flooding and landslides. Property damage and economic losses across the Solomon Islands totaled $25 million and $100 million (1986 USD) respectively. During the aftermath of the storm, the government of the Solomon Islands declared a national state of emergency. Meanwhile, the United Kingdom, Papua New Guinea, the United States, and Japan also sent supplies and goods to the Solomon Islands.

Meteorological history

During the middle of May 1986, the monsoon trough of low pressure became very active, between the island nations of Tuvalu and the Solomon Islands. Two depressions subsequently developed within this monsoon trough, with the first going on to become Typhoon Lola in the Northern Hemisphere. During the next day, as the depression moved eastwards, it showed signs of weakening with clouds associated with the system disintegrating. However, the system remained in an area favourable for Tropical cyclogenesis, before the system re-intensified and developed two weak feeder bands. The United States Joint Typhoon Warning Center (JTWC) subsequently started to issue warnings on the system and designated it as Tropical Cyclone 33P early on May 17, after the depression had developed gale-force winds.

After being named, the system continued to move south-westwards and continued to intensify, before an eye feature was reported as it passed over Malaita during May 18. The system subsequently crossed Guadalcanal and 160°E where it moved into the Australian region during May 19, where a broad and ragged eye became visible in satellite imagery but quickly became obscured by high cloud. Namu subsequently came under the influence of high level westerly winds, which steered the system on a south-easterly track and back into the South Pacific basin. After it moved back into the South Pacific basin, Namu accelerated towards southern Vanuatu and rapidly weakened into a depression, as cold air from the subtropics wrapped into the system. Namu subsequently dissipated during May 22, after it had merged into an eastwards moving trough of low pressure near south-eastern Vanuatu.

Effects
Severe Tropical Cyclone Namu impacted the Solomon Islands, Vanuatu and New Caledonia and caused over 100 deaths, as well as varying amounts of damage to the island nations. The Solomon Islands was the first island nation to be impacted by Cyclone Namu, where it became the worst tropical cyclone on record and killed over 100 people. After the Solomon Islands had been impacted, the FMS issued special weather bulletins for Vanuatu during May 21, as Namu's projected track took it near or over the southern islands of the island nation. However, these were terminated later that day after Namu had rapidly weakened into a tropical depression. The system also caused heavy rainfall in New Caledonia, which lead to various roads being temporarily closed. As a direct result of its impacts, the name Namu was later retired from the lists of tropical cyclone names for the South Pacific by the World Meteorological Organization.

Solomon Islands
The FMS started to issue special weather bulletins for the Solomon Islands Meteorological Service (SIMS) during May 15, which advised that the system had gale-force winds associated with it and that it would affect Malaita and smaller islands. As a result, the SIMS issued a gale warning before the bulletins were suspended during the next day, after the system weakened and it became doubtful that gales were associated with the depression. After the depression was named Namu during May 17, the FMS resumed issuing the weather bulletins, which advised the SIMS of the threat posed by Namu to Malaita, Guadalcanal, San Cristobal and other smaller islands. Over the next few days, these bulletins were revised accordingly and advised the SIMS which areas would be affected by gale, storm and hurricane-force winds and the threat of flooding from rain or storm surge. These bulletins were subsequently used by the SIMS to prepare various gale and tropical cyclone warnings, which were subsequently broadcast in English and Pidgin around the clock by the Solomon Islands Broadcasting Corporation. As the system approached and moved over the island nation on May 18, the Solomon Islands National Disaster Council was convened to oversee the relief effort. Within the Solomon Islands, initial expectations were for a run of the mill tropical cyclone of a moderate intensity to impact the Solomon Islands. However, many people were caught off guard by the cyclone's sudden increase in winds and the prolonged heavy rain, especially in remote areas where weather forecasts were difficult to disseminate because of communication problems.

Weather
They also estimated that gale-force winds had impacted the area in between San Cristóbal, the Russell Islands, Santa Isabel and the northern tip of Malaita. However, because of Namu's slow movement through the island nation, the majority of the deaths and damages, were caused by heavy rain, floods and mudslides, rather than as a direct effect of Namu's winds.

Death toll
Namu is commonly thought to have caused 150 deaths when it impacted the Solomon Islands, however, this death toll is disputed with different totals listed in reliable sources. Within their final report, the Solomon Islands National Disaster Council reported that Namu had caused about 103 deaths, however, only 63 people were listed as dead or missing. In particular they noted that 49 of these deaths occurred on Guadalcanal, 11 on Malaita, 2 in the Temotu province and 1 on Makaria. During July 1991, Russell Blong and Deirdre Radford of Macquarie University published the results of an extensive survey into the natural disasters in the Solomon Islands, which "positively identified" 111 deaths in association with Cyclone Namu.

Sikaiana
During May 17, the newly named Tropical Cyclone Namu passed within  of the isolated atoll: Sikaiana, which bore the brunt of the system as it approached the Solomon Islands. Storm surge associated with the cyclone inundated the island with salt water, which contaminated water wells and exacerbated difficulties with fresh water supplies. The storm surge also destroyed the majority of the traditional housing that had been made out of palm fronds and left the islanders without any food, water or shelter. Over the next few weeks, the islanders relied on coconut milk, until HMAS Brunei was able to deliver relief supplies and over 200 drums of fresh water on June 4.

Malaita
After impacting Sikaiana, Namu moved south-westwards towards the southern part of Malaita, where it seemed to slow down and remain near-stationary for around five hours. High winds associated with Namu, damaged roofs and defoliated the hills over central, southern and western Malaita, while waves damaged the coastline.

Gudalcanal
Within the island nation meandering rivers changed their course and cut a straight path, which brought mud, silt and debris to rich farming areas. The floods also exposed a site of an American and Japanese World War 2 ammunition dump on Guadalcanal from Henderson Field to Red Beach.

Makira

Rennell and Bellona
Namu passed just to the west of the Rennell and Bellona Province, with both islands in the province feeling the effects of the cyclone. On Rennell Island, 20 houses were destroyed while both the school and the airstrip were damaged by storm surge, high winds and heavy rain. The damage to Bellona was considered more serious with 160 traditional houses destroyed by storm surge, high winds and heavy rain.

Impact

Most of the damage caused by Cyclone Namu occurred due to river flooding. The cyclone affected 48% of the Solomon's land area and 62% of its total population. Along the eastern coast of the island, damage was massive; entire villages were destroyed. Gardens were devastated and walking pathways were blocked. In Babanakira, 5 people died.

On the island of Guadalcanal, a single mudslide was responsible for killing 38 villagers. Of the 43 people that lived in the small town of Valebaibai, only 5 survived, all of whom narrowly escaped. Moreover, 14 dead bodies were found in the central and southern areas of Guadalcanal on May 21 when flood waters began to recede.

Deep flood water covered 75% of the island's (Guadalcanal) coastal plain; these waters cut off channels and destroyed coastal villages. Furthermore, the Lungga, Ngalimbiu, Mberande, and Nggurambusu rivers sustained the worst flood damage; water depth in some of the aforementioned rivers reached . Many trees were brought down due to high winds. Also, numerous plantations were destroyed across the island. However, little beach erosion occurred on the island. Moreover, 22% of homes on the island were either damaged or destroyed. One bridge was also destroyed on the island. Throughout the capital, several schools were destroyed. The two bridges that connected the city with the island of Guadalcanal were destroyed, thus leaving Honiara isolated. Furthermore, about 5,000 homeless were left homeless across the city, 2,000 of whom sought refuge in a local college due to the storm. Although no people were to have confirmed to have died in the city, five children were reported missing in one of the capital's suburbs, Ngalimera.

In both Guadalacal and Malatia, extensive areas of irrigated rice crops were submerged under floodwaters and mud. In some areas, nearly all homes were destroyed. Mudslides and logs destroyed roads, bridges, water pipes and drainage systems. Crops such as cocoa, copra, coffee, and rice were destroyed, resulting in thousands of dollars in damage. Additionally, communication between the outer and island of the Solomon group was completely destroyed.

In all, approximately 90,000 people, one third of the country's population, were reportedly homeless. The southern islands of the Solomon's chain were seriously affected by the passage of Namu, becoming the worst tropical cyclone to impact the area in five years. Of the 25,000 "traditional" houses on the Solomon Island, 6,000 (26%) were destroyed.  Most of the fatalities were due to landslides and flooding. Property damaged totaled $25 million (1986 USD) and the storm also caused US $100 million in economic losses in the Solomon Islands. On May 18, Honiara's Central Hospital authorities decided to evacuate several patients, as the hospital was located on a coastal strip that was vulnerable to river flooding and seawater inundation.

Aftermath
During May 19, the Government of the Solomon Islands declared a state of national disaster and decided that the emergency period would run until May 31. As a result, the government started to ask bilateral donors including Australia, New Zealand and the United Nations for assistance. However, before any foreign assistance could arrive in the Solomon Islands, residents started to try to help themselves by patching up water pipes with bamboo, string and rubber strips. New Zealand subsequently donated an initial , while the Australian High Commission subsequently donated an initial  worth of relief supplies. This included two C-130 Hercules cargo planes from the Royal Australian Air Force, a detachment party, relief supplies and two Iroquois helicopters. These aircraft arrived during May 21, when Henderson Field Airport reopened for emergency operations, after flood waters had receded and the mud and debris had been removed.

Within a week following the storm, access to fresh water was resorted to the archipelago; doctors believed that had these services not been restored, widespread disease would have been reported. The government declared June 2 a national day of mourning for the victims of the storm.

The International Monetary Fund loaned $1.3 million USD to the nation. Also, $10,000 ECU was donated to the devastated island group. Other countries, including the United Kingdom, Papua New Guinea, the United States, and Japan also sent supplies and goods to the Solomon Islands. Overall, US$8.6 million was provided to the Solomons  and  worth of supplies were provided to victims of the cyclone.

During May 26, Henderson Field was reopened for commercial flights

Moreover, a commercial aircraft provided supplies to the 200 inhabitants of Sikiana Island, which had run out of food a week after the storm. In all, a total of 17 coastal trading vessels, four helicopters, and six aircraft were used to transport food, tents and medical supplies to the needy. It was estimated that the homeless would require aid such as food for six months.

Elsewhere, in Honiara, the local ministry asked each resident to pay $50 so that the roofs that were damaged by the system could be repaired. The cleanup process took a long time; a year after the storm, bulldozers were reportedly still removing broken logs and not all roads had been repaired. Following the storm, disease spread to isolated part of the Solomon Island group; many animals died and hundreds of children were hospitalized because of the outbreak of disease.

Longer term aftermath 
On June 4, the Government of the Solomon Islands lifted the emergency period, four weeks after the system had impacted the islands. After the emergency period was lifted, outside assistance that had been brought in to assist with relief efforts were gradually withdrawn, including armed services from Australia and New Zealand. However, external assistance from Australia and New Zealand amongst others, was still needed due to the Solomon Islands reliance on overseas aid in general. Pledges of assistance were made by Australia, Britain, New Zealand, the European Economic Community and agencies of the United Nations and the United States of America. These programs included projects to replace rural primary schools flattened by the cyclone, bridges and water supply systems swept away by Namu.

During December 1986, the then Solomon Islands Prime Minister Sir Peter Kenilorea resigned, after allegations surfaced that he had channelled aid from France for Cyclone Namu towards the rebuilding of his village. However, the allegation was never proven.

During March 1987, volunteers from the Australian Rotarians, commenced an eighteen-month project to build 93 schools in the Solomon Islands.

Questions were raised during the systems aftermath over whether or not excessive deforestation worsened the impact of the flood. The government denied reports that deforestation had any link to the catastrophe.

Notes

See also

Cyclone Zoe - impacted the Solomon Islands as a Category 5 severe tropical cyclone.
List of off-season South Pacific tropical cyclones
List of wettest tropical cyclones

References

External links

Devastation by cyclone - ABC News
Impacts of a cyclone: days or decades? - ABC News

Namu
Namu
Namu
Namu
Namu
Namu
Namu
Off-season Australian region tropical cyclones